Clancy Rofique (born 22 July 1998) is a Mauritian international footballer who plays as a forward for the Mauritius national football team.

Career statistics

International

References

1998 births
Living people
Mauritian footballers
Mauritian expatriate footballers
Mauritius international footballers
Association football forwards
Le Havre AC players
ESM Gonfreville players
Mauritian expatriate sportspeople in France
Expatriate footballers in France